Once Upon a Time in Mesopotamia is a 1998 documentary film adapted from the nonfiction book of the same name by French Assyriologist Jean Bottéro and archaeologist Marie-Joseph Stève. Directed by Jean-Claude Lubtchansky, and co-produced by Trans Europe Film, La Sept-Arte, Éditions Gallimard, Louvre Museum and La Cinquième, with voice-over narration by French actors François Marthouret,  and the director, the documentary is structured like an adventure film, takes viewers into the world of the first discoverers, epigraphists and Assyriologists who revealed Mesopotamian archaeology to the modern world.

The film was broadcast on Arte on 30 May 1998, as part of the channel's television programme The Human Adventure, and rebroadcast on La Cinquième on 4 and 5 June of the same year. In addition to German dubbing, the documentary has been subtitled into English and Spanish, and released on DVD by Centre national du cinéma et de l'image animée (CNC).

Synopsis 
Mesopotamia, the land between two rivers, whose brilliant civilisation began to develop 5000 years ago, apart from the reports of some ancient Greek and Roman chroniclers, it existed only as a biblical legend. It is the oldest and longest civilisation, both for the influence it exerted on the Near East and on the Greek world as for its contribution to the material and spiritual development of humanity, and oddly the most poorly known to the general public.

Today, however, many—albeit scattered—archaeological finds and various sites provide an impressive insight into the richness of this civilisation that invented writing and produced the first scientific systems and literary works. The artefacts kept in various European museums, the archaeological sites and the excavations themselves are documented on the basis of archive material, that is, photos, watercolours, drawings and films. Expedition reports and images of life in Mesopotamia before the first Iraq war illustrating the human adventure of reconstructing a lost civilisation.

Production 
The documentary was partially shot in Iraq, in the land of clay and reed between the Tigris and Euphrates rivers.

The book 

The book , on which the film is based, is an illustrated monograph on Mesopotamian archaeology, published in pocket format by Éditions Gallimard on 4 November 1993. Co-written by French Assyriologist and biblicist Jean Bottéro, and his research companion—an archaeologist and Dominican monk—Marie-Joseph Stève, the work is the  volume in the encyclopaedic collection 'Découvertes Gallimard', and part of the collection's  series. That is to say, here the subject is the rediscovery of Mesopotamian civilisation, the decipherment of cuneiform, and the study of archaeological sites, objects and documents discovered in the region, from the late eighteenth century onwards (history of Assyriology), but not the history of this civilisation.

According to the tradition of 'Découvertes', which is based on an abundant pictorial documentation and a way of bringing together visual documents and texts, enhanced by printing on coated paper; in other words, 'genuine monographs, published like art books'.

While many of the French titles from the collection make it into English, this book has never been translated.

References

External links 
 
 Il était une fois la Mésopotamie (the film) on CNC Images de la culture 
 Il était une fois la Mésopotamie (the book) at Éditions Gallimard 

1998 documentary films
1998 films
French documentary television films
Documentary films about Iraq
Films based on non-fiction books
Films shot in Iraq
Découvertes Gallimard
1993 non-fiction books
Archaeology books
Books about the ancient Near East
Mesopotamia
1990s French films